California 37 is the sixth studio album from California rock band Train. The album was released on April 13, 2012 through Columbia Records. It is the last Train album to feature drummer Scott Underwood before his departure in 2014 and the last recorded as a three-piece. It was preceded by the lead single "Drive By" on January 10, 2012.

Background
Train recorded the album in San Francisco and Los Angeles with Butch Walker and Espionage, and Monahan says that a majority of the writing happened while the group was touring Save Me, San Francisco. "I didn't spend 3 months or 5 months writing, I just wrote throughout the course of the last 3 years," said Monahan. "We have 13 songs that we've recorded and I want to hear every single one of them over and over again."

Recording
California 37 was recorded in various locations across North America. Recording sessions for the band's sixth studio album took place at the Tiny Telephone and Hyde Street Studios in San Francisco and at Ruby Red Studios located in Los Angeles. Additional recording and production for the album also took place at the Bear Creek Studios in Woodinville, Washington, and at the Avast! Recording Studios in Seattle, Washington. Other studios used by the band for recording on California 37 include Integrated Studios, Flux Studios, MSR Studios and Peaceful Waters Music, all located in New York City, and at the Quayside Studios in Newcastle, England.

Album title and cover
The album is named after California State Route 37, a state highway in the North San Francisco Bay Area in northern California. The album's cover is a picture of a 1961 Cadillac on a barren road with the highway shield of California State Route 37 in the foreground, and a shadow overlay of the band's crown logo used on every album since their debut.

Critical reception 

California 37 received generally mixed reviews from music critics upon its release. At Metacritic, which assigns a normalised rating out of 100 to reviews from mainstream critics, the album received an average score of 53 based on 6 reviews, which indicates "mixed or average reviews". Both the BBC and The New York Times gave the album mixed reviews. On the other hand, the Northwest Herald and Billboard gave the album a positive review. USA Today journalist Brian Mansfield appreciated California 37 for having "its heart in the right place", despite certain awkward moments, particularly the references to older pop songs. He felt that "at its best, California 37's emphatic bursts of melody are buoyant and life affirming".

Commercial performance
The album debuted at number 10 on the UK Albums Chart in the United Kingdom, selling 7,809 copies. It is their highest-charting album there since Drops of Jupiter which peaked at number eight in 2001. In the United States, California 37 debuted at number four on the Billboard 200 with first-week sales of 76,000 copies. It is their fourth top 10 album and their highest-charting album in the US.  As of September 2012, California 37 has sold 254,000 copies.

On June 25, Train is re-issuing the album as California 37: Mermaids of Alcatraz Tour Edition. It will have three additional studio recordings on it: "Futon", "To Be Loved" and a cover of John Lennon's "Imagine". The album will also have 3 live songs off of California 37 taken from the band's 2012 San Francisco Tour: "Drive By (Live from San Francisco)," "This'll Be My Year (Live from San Francisco)," and "When The Fog Rolls In (Live from San Francisco)."

Singles
"Drive By" was released as the album's lead single on January 10, 2012. It was commercially successful, peaking at number 10 on the Billboard Hot 100—giving the band their third top ten hit on the chart—and at number 2 on the Billboard Adult Top 40. It also reached the top ten in several other countries, including Austria, Denmark, Germany, the Netherlands, Sweden, Switzerland, and the United Kingdom. The single was later certified three times platinum by Music Canada and the Recording Industry Association of America, two times platinum by the Australian Recording Industry Association, The song's music video, directed by Alan Ferguson and shot at Shafer Vineyards, premiered on VH1 on February 14, 2012. "Feels Good at First" was released digitally on March 26 in the week preceding the album's release. "50 Ways to Say Goodbye" was released to adult contemporary radio in the United States as the album's second official single on June 11, with a release to mainstream radio following on July 31. The single peaked at numbers 20 and 4 respectively on the Billboard Hot 100 and the Adult Top 40.

"Bruises", featuring American country singer Ashley Monroe, was released as the third single from California 37 on October 5, 2012. The song was re-recorded in both English and French with singer Marilou for its Canadian single release, while the original version was released to country radio and peaked at number 79 on the Hot 100. On November 28, Train announced that "This'll Be My Year" would be released as the album's fourth single in Australia. The following day, it officially impacted radio in the country. "Mermaid" was released to American adult contemporary radio as the album's fifth overall and final single on December 27.

Track listing

Personnel
Credits for California 37 adapted from AllMusic.

Train

 Pat Monahan – vocals, songwriting
 Jimmy Stafford – guitar
 Scott Underwood – drums

Additional Personnel

 Jerry Becker – keyboards, songwriting 
 Amund Bjørklund – producer, programming
 Eva Burmeister – violin
 Karen Dreyfus – viola
 Mark Endert – mixing
 George Flynn – bass trombone, tuba
 Katherine Fong – violin
 Quan Ge – violin
 Aaron Heick – alto sax, oboe
 David Hodges – songwriting, production
 Sam Hollander – songwriting
 Birch Johnson – trombone
 Vivek Kamath – viola
 Dave Katz – songwriting
 Shmuel Katz – viola
 Jeff Kievit – trumpet
 Lisa Kim – violin, concertmaster
 Krzysztof Kuznik – violin
 Hyunju Lee – violin
 Kuan Cheng Lu – violin
 Espen Lind – producer, bass, guitar, keyboards, background vocals, programming, Weissenborn, string arrangement, ukulele, harmonium
 Brad Magers – horns
 Hector Maldonado – bass 
 Jorgen Malo – orchestration
 Ashley Monroe – vocals
 Kurt Muroki – bass
 Jooyoung Oh – violin
 Suzanne Ornstein – violin
 Diji Parq – songwriting, production
 John Patitucci – bass
 Anna Rabinova – violin
 Tim Ries – tenor sax, clarinet
 Robert Rinehart – viola
 Roger Rosenberg – baritone sax, bassoon
 Allen Shamblin – songwriting
 Jake Sinclair – programming
 Lenny Skolnik – programming
 Mina Smith – cello
 Alan Stepansky – cello
 Jenny Strenger – violin
 Kathryn Tickell –Northumbrian pipes
 Butch Walker – songwriting, production
 Gregg Wattenberg – songwriting, production
 The West Los Angeles Children's Choir – vocals
 Mary Wooten – cello
 Sharon Yamanda – violin
 Wei Yu – cello

Charts

Weekly charts

Year-end charts

Certifications

Release history

References

Columbia Records albums
Train (band) albums
2012 albums
Albums produced by Butch Walker
Albums recorded at Bear Creek Studio